Fabienne Brugère (born in 1964 in Nevers) is a French philosopher specializing in aesthetics and philosophy of art, history of modern philosophy (18th century), moral and political philosophy, Anglo-American philosophy studies and feminist theory. She was a professor at the Bordeaux Montaigne University and vice-president for international relations at this university. She joined the Paris 8 University Vincennes-Saint-Denis since September 2014, as chair of "philosophy of modern and contemporary arts". She has been president of the Paris Lumières University Group since November 2019, after having chaired the academic council of this institution.

Education
Fabienne Brugère was admitted to the École normale supérieure de Fontenay-Saint-Cloud in 1987. She obtained the agrégation in philosophy in 1991 after a year spent at the Imperial College London (Department of Humanities). In 1996, she defended her thesis entitled  (Theory of Art and Philosophy of Sociability according to Shaftesbury), at Paris Nanterre University with Geneviève Brykman, her thesis director, Didier Deleule, Jean-Paul Larthomas, Michel Malherbe, and Pierre-François Moreau.

Career
She taught philosophy as a lecturer at the University of Paris X-Nanterre (1992-1995), as a Attaché Temporaire d'Enseignement et de Recherche (ATER) at the University of Western Brittany and University of Nantes (1995-1997), and as a lecturer at the University of Toulouse-Jean Jaurès. She was elected professor at the Bordeaux Montaigne University with a title "Philosophy of English language" after a habilitation to direct research defended at Paris Nanterre University in November 2003 on the theme "Empiricism and its aesthetic operations". She left Bordeaux for the Paris 8 University Vincennes-Saint-Denis in September 2014.

Brugère is a visiting professor at the University of Hamburg, University of Québec, and University of Munich. 

She was president of the Sustainable Development Council of Bordeaux between June 2008 and June 2013. In 2014, she was on the list of the socialist candidate Vincent Feltesse for the municipal elections in Bordeaux. She is also the co-president of "Périféeries 2028", which seeks to make Saint-Denis, Plaine Commune, and Seine-Saint-Denis the European Capital of Culture, 2028.

She directs the collections "Lignes d'art" and "Care studies" at Presses Universitaires de France (PUF), Paris and "Diagnostics" at Editions du Bord de l'eau, Bordeaux/Lormont.

Awards and honours
 Knight, Legion of Honour, April 2015

Selected works

Books
 Théorie de l'art et philosophie de la sociabilité selon Shaftesbury, éditions Honoré Champion, coll. « Les Dix-huitièmes siècles », 1999
 Le goût : art, passions et société, PUF, coll. « philosophies », 2000
 L'expérience de la beauté, Vrin, 2006
 C’est trop beau, Giboulées Gallimard Jeunesse, March 2008, translated into Korean and Spanish
 Questions de respect : Enquête sur les figures contemporaines du respect with Maryvonne Charmillot and Raphaël Gély, Université de Bruxelles, coll. « Philosophie et société » 
 Le sexe de la sollicitude, octobre 2008, éditions du Seuil (republished by Le Bord de l'eau), 2013
 Philosophie de l'art with Julia Peker, September 2010, Presses Universitaires de France - PUF, coll. «Licence Philo» 
 L'éthique du « care », Presses Universitaires de France - PUF, coll. « Que sais-je? », February 2011, reissued twice, 
 Le nouvel esprit du libéralisme  with Guillaume le Blanc, éditions Le Bord de l'eau, coll. « Diagnostics », November 2011, 
 Faut-il se révolter, Bayard Jeunesse, coll. « Le temps d'une question », March 2012 
 Dictionnaire politique à l'usage des gouvernés with and under the direction of Guillaume le Blanc, Groupe Bayard, Bayard Jeunesse, coll. « Essais », March 2012 .
 La politique de l'individu, La République des Idées/Seuil, 2013
 La fin de l'hospitalité, with Guillaume le Blanc, Flammarion, 2017
 On ne naît pas femme, on le devient, Stock, 2019

References

External links
 Fabienne Brugère at PUF

1964 births
Living people
21st-century French philosophers
Academic staff of Bordeaux Montaigne University
Academic staff of Paris 8 University Vincennes-Saint-Denis
Chevaliers of the Légion d'honneur
French women philosophers
Alumni of Imperial College London
Academic staff of the University of Nantes
ENS Fontenay-Saint-Cloud-Lyon alumni